Severn Freewheelers Emergency Voluntary Service is a blood bike charity based in the Severn Valley in western England.  Founded in 2007, it provides a free motorcycle courier service to hospitals in the region, operating a fleet of emergency-equipped motorcycles which are ridden and co-ordinated by volunteers.
Severn Freewheelers is a founder-member of the Nationwide Association of Blood Bikes (NABB) and co-operates with similar organisations in the area including Freewheelers EVS (Bristol and Somerset), SERV (south England) and Midland Freewheelers (north-west Birmingham).

Operations
Severn Freewheelers works for hospitals in Gloucestershire, Herefordshire, Worcestershire and north Wiltshire, with its operations extending into southern Birmingham and Coventry.  Major hospitals served include Gloucester Royal, Cheltenham General, Hereford County, Worcester Royal, Redditch Alexandra and Swindon Great Western, with many smaller hospitals also served including Tewkesbury, Moreton-in-Marsh, Cinderford, Stroud, Dursley, Cirencester, Ross-on-Wye, Leominster, Bromyard, Ledbury, Kidderminster, Bromsgrove, Malvern, Tenbury Wells, Evesham, Pershore, Chippenham and Savernake.

Operating between 7 pm and 7 am on weekdays and 24 hours at weekends and public holidays, the charity provides a service enabling hospitals to avoid the need to use taxis or commercial couriers, saving the NHS an estimated £150,000 each year across the area.

By December 2019, the charity had covered over 1,700,000 miles, had responded to more than 46,000 calls, and was receiving over 500 calls each month.  Items carried include samples for pathological or micro-biological analysis, blood and blood products for transfusion, patient notes, drugs, scans and medical equipment.  Recent developments include the collection of human breast milk from donors’ homes and its transport to human milk banks at Oxford, Bristol and Birmingham, and regular re-supply of blood products to the Midlands Air Ambulance based at Strensham on the M5 as part of the RePHILL clinical trial.

During the coronavirus-19 crisis the charity responded by temporarily extending its service to operate 24/7.  In addition, some 80 volunteers were recruited from the general public to make home deliveries of medications from general hospitals in Hereford and Gloucestershire.  Nearly 3,000 deliveries had been made as of September 2020.

Fund-raising
In 2011, the charity held its first Prescott Bike Festival at the Prescott Speed Hill Climb circuit near Bishop's Cleeve in Gloucestershire, which attracted 5,000 visitors. This has since become an annual event.

It also mounts displays at local shows such as the Three Counties Show, the Cotswold Show, the Emergency Services Show,  and local music festivals, and attends motorcycle safety events such as BikeSafe.  Several motorcycling celebrities including racers Carl Fogarty and Jamie Whitham have offered to help support the charity in raising funds to support its work.

References

External links

Blood bikes
Charities based in Gloucestershire
2007 establishments in England
Organizations established in 2007